Alessio Sartori (born 13 November 1976) is an Italian competition rower and Olympic champion.

Biography
He received a gold medal in quadruple sculls at the 2000 Summer Olympics in Sydney, together with Agostino Abbagnale, Simone Raineri, and Rossano Galtarossa.

He received a bronze medal in the double scull event at the 2004 Summer Olympics in Athens, together with Rossano Galtarossa.

He received a silver medal in double sculls at the 2012 Summer Olympics in London, together with Romano Battisti.

References

External links
 
 
 
 

1976 births
Living people
Italian male rowers
Olympic rowers of Italy
Olympic gold medalists for Italy
Olympic bronze medalists for Italy
Olympic silver medalists for Italy
Olympic medalists in rowing
Rowers at the 1996 Summer Olympics
Rowers at the 2000 Summer Olympics
Rowers at the 2004 Summer Olympics
Rowers at the 2008 Summer Olympics
Rowers at the 2012 Summer Olympics
Medalists at the 2000 Summer Olympics
Medalists at the 2004 Summer Olympics
Medalists at the 2012 Summer Olympics
World Rowing Championships medalists for Italy
Mediterranean Games gold medalists for Italy
Mediterranean Games medalists in rowing
Competitors at the 2005 Mediterranean Games
Rowers of Fiamme Gialle